Marek Laczynski (1925 – 23 November 2021) was a printmaker, illustrator and teacher, born in Warsaw Poland. Laczynski was a member of the Polish Home Army in 1941 and was involved in the Warsaw uprising.
From 1949 to 1952 he studied book illustration at the Borough Polytechnic and then lithography at the Central School of Art and Design from 1962 to 1964. He was a founding member of the Printmakers Council in 1965. He taught printmaking at Exeter College of Art and Design from 1964 until 1985, when he moved to Austria.

His work is held in the V&A, Exeter University and London University.

Bibliography 
 The Wizard and His Pupil - a Polish Fairy Tale 1972 Bartholomew Press, Exeter
 Faces of Fear 1973 Exeter College of Art and Design

References

1925 births
2021 deaths
Warsaw Uprising insurgents
Home Army members
Alumni of the Central School of Art and Design
Polish illustrators
Polish emigrants to the United Kingdom
Artists from Exeter